is an April 1970 Japanese film directed by Shōgorō Nishimura and starring Annu Mari and Sanae Ōhori. The major Japanese film studio Nikkatsu began to experiment with erotic-themed movies beginning in the late 1960s in an attempt to save the company from insolvency. Cruel Female Love Suicide continued this trend which eventually resulted in the inauguration of Nikkatsu's Roman porno series of films in November 1971 with Apartment Wife: Affair In the Afternoon, also directed by Shōgorō Nishimura.

Plot
Chie (Sanae Ōhori), newly arrived in Tokyo, saves her friend from school, Mari (played by the half-Indian actress Annu Mari), from a suicide attempt. The two girls become close, eventually leading to a lesbian relationship. Their affair drifts into sadism and involvement with a bizarre sex cult, resulting in the deaths of the two lovers.

Cast
Annu Mari as Mari
 as Chie
 as Matsui
 as Eiji
Haruo Tanaka as Aihara
 as Maeda

Release
The film was released theatrically in Japan on April 18, 1970 by the Nikkatsu studio which also produced a VHS tape version in January 1990.

See also
List of lesbian, gay, bisexual or transgender-related films

References

External links 

1970 films
Films directed by Shōgorō Nishimura
Japanese LGBT-related films
1970s Japanese-language films
Lesbian-related films
Nikkatsu films
1970s Japanese films